Conus ebraeus, common name the black-and-white cone or Hebrew cone, is a species of sea snail, a marine gastropod mollusk in the family Conidae, the cone snails and their allies.

Description

The height of the shell varies from 25 mm to 62 mm. The width of the shell of type specimen is 19 mm. The height of the shell of type specimen is 28 mm.

Conus ebraeus has an easily recognisable small, squat shell, with a rounded, short spire.

The shell is white, with a pattern of blackish squares, sometimes rose-tinted, with three or four revolving bands composed of irregular longitudinal dark chocolate or nearly black markings; these markings also ornament the slightly coronated spire. The aperture is white with clouded bands corresponding with the exterior markings. The surface is more or less striate throughout, but striae are more prominent towards the dark stained base.

This species is extremely similar to Conus judaeus. The two are best distinguished by close examination of the radular teeth.

Distribution
Conus ebraeus is one of the most widely distributed members of its genus and occurs in shallow water, tropical regions throughout the Indo-West and eastern Pacific, from the Red Sea to the shores of the Americas.

The type locality is India.

Localities include:
 Aldabra
 Chagos
 Guam
 Hawaii
 Houtman Abrolhos
 Kenya
 Madagascar
 Mascarene Basin
 Mozambique
 Okinawa
 Papua New Guinea
 Red Sea
 Tanzania
 Taiwan
 West Coast of South Africa

Habitat 
Conus ebraeus lives near rocky shores, lower eulittoral, often under boulders.

Feeding habits 
Like all species within the genus Conus, these snails are predatory and venomous. They are capable of "stinging" humans, therefore live ones should be handled carefully or not at all.

While the focal prey of Conus ebraeus are eunicid polychaetes (i.e., members of the genus Palola) at most locations in the Indo-West Pacific (e.g., the Maldives, eastern Indian Ocean, Great Barrier Reef, Okinawa and Guam), at Hawaii and the Seychelles this species predominantly preys on nereid polychaetes. These results suggest that Conus ebraeus exhibits geographic variation in dietary specialization.

Prey of Conus ebraeus include Perinereis helleri (family Nereididae), Palola sp., Eunice cariboea and Lysidice collaris (all three from family Eunicidae).

Gallery

References
 Linnaeus, C. (1758). Systema Naturae per regna tria naturae, secundum classes, ordines, genera, species, cum characteribus, differentiis, synonymis, locis. Editio decima, reformata. Laurentius Salvius: Holmiae. ii, 824 pp 
 This article incorporates CC-BY-2.5 text from the reference  and CC-BY-SA-3.0 text from the reference  and public domain text from the reference.

External links
 Cone Shells - Knights of the Sea
 

ebraeus
Gastropods described in 1758
Taxa named by Carl Linnaeus